Rumduol is a district located in Svay Rieng Province, Cambodia. The district is subdivided into 10 khums and 78 phums. According to the 1998 census of Cambodia, it has a population of 49,384.

References 

Districts of Svay Rieng province